Néstor Abad Sanjuan (born 29 March 1993) is a Spanish male artistic gymnast and part of the national team.  He participated in every edition of the World Championships since his debut in 2013, and qualified for the 2016 Summer Olympics and the 2020 Summer Olympics.

References

External links
 
 
 
 
 

1993 births
Living people
Spanish male artistic gymnasts
Gymnasts from Madrid
Gymnasts at the 2015 European Games
Gymnasts at the 2019 European Games
European Games competitors for Spain
Gymnasts at the 2010 Summer Youth Olympics
Gymnasts at the 2016 Summer Olympics
Olympic gymnasts of Spain
Mediterranean Games gold medalists for Spain
Competitors at the 2013 Mediterranean Games
Mediterranean Games medalists in gymnastics
Gymnasts at the 2020 Summer Olympics
Gymnasts at the 2022 Mediterranean Games
21st-century Spanish people